Ulcinj Airport (Montenegrin: Аеродром Улцињ / Aerodrom Ulcinj) was an airport in the Ulcinj Municipality in Montenegro.

History
In the 1940s, Aeroput's Belgrade–Podgorica flight extended
to the coastal town of Bar.

Defunct airports
Airports in Montenegro